Cnestrum is a genus of mosses belonging to the family Dicranaceae.

The species of this genus are found in Northern Hemisphere.

Species:
 Cnestrum alpestre (Wahlenb. ex Huebener) Nyholm ex Mogensen 
 Cnestrum glaucescens Holmen ex Mogensen & Steere, 1979

References

Dicranales
Moss genera